Moonzy and his friends or simply Luntik, in its English version better known as Moonzy, is a Russian animated series for children.

TV broadcast
In Russia, the show premiered on the TV channel Россия-1 and was broadcast for 8 years from 1 September 2006 until 15 May 2014. On 16 June 2014, it moved to the  channel Россия-К It is also broadcast on Netflix as of 24 March 2008, on Мульт as of 1 June 2014-present. It premiered during Good Night Little Ones.

In Ukraine the show airs on channels TET (2011—2016) (Russian original and without subtitles) and Novyi Kanal (2017—2018) (with Ukrainian dubbing).

In China the show airs on the channel CCTV Kids (2020—).

Creators 
In parentheses indicate the season number.

Scenario author - Darina Schmidt (1-7), Sarra Anson (Anna Sarantsevа, 1-5), Elena Galdobina (с 3), Fedor Dmitriev (со 2), Elena Pavlikova (1, с 7), Dmitry Yakovenko (1), Marina Bogdanova (1) Marina Komarkevich (1-2,4-5), Natalia Stepanova (1-2, 5,с 8), Alina Sokolova (1-2, 5, с 8), Andrew Chibis (1), Andrei Sazonov (1-4) Kirill Glezin (1), Olga Obraztsova (1, 3-5, 7), Tatiana Gorbushina (со 2), Victor Perel'man (2), Anna Sosnora (2,с 7), Tatiana Ionova (2), Alexander Bogdanov (2-5), Dmitry and Natalia Zakharovs (2), Aleksey Anoshkin (2-3), Tatiana Klein (3), Galina Voropay (3-4), Valeria Tumanova (3), Vladimir Bouriak (3), Pavel Vasilyev (3, 6), Elena Fedyahina (4), Vera Bekeleva (4-6), Konstantin Bronzit (4), Oleg Kim (5, с 7), Leonid Magergut (5-6), Marina May (5), Richat Gilmetdinov (5-6) Alexander Yaskina (5), Yevgeny Skukovsky (5-6), Evgeniya Golubeva (5-6), Svetlana Krupenko (6), Maria Domogatskaya (Montvid) (6-7), Julia Savchenko (6) Anastasia Chistjakova (6), Vladimir Haunin (6), Vadim Smolyak (с 7), Tatiana Manetina (с 7), Svetlana Sachenko (с 7), Ekaterina Maksymenko (с 7).

Head writer - Sarra Anson (1-5), Elena Galdobina (с 3)

Director - Darina Schmidt (1, 3-4, 6), Olga Obraztsova (1, 3-5, с 7), Lyudmila Steblyanko (1-6, с 8), Anton Rudin (1-4), Galina Voropay (1-4,с  7), Catherine Shraga (1-6), Elena Galdobina (2-7), Fedor Dmitriev (2-6), Ekaterina Salabay (с 3), Alexey Anoshkin (3), Olga Kazhanova (4, с 8), Richat Gilmetdinov (4), Anna Mironova (с 4), Mikhail Safronov (4), Alexey Pichuzhin (с 4), Evgenia Golubeva (5-6), Alexander Mal'gin (с 7), Tatiana Gorbushina ( с 7), Alexandra Kovtun (с 7), Lyudmila Klinova (с 7)

Art director - Marina Komarkevich (1-2), Darina Schmidt (1), Tatiana Klein (2-6), Irina Fedorova (5-6), Vita Tkacheva (7), Ekaterina Maksymenko (7), Konstantin Bronzit (unknown)

Composer - Maksim Koshevarov (1-6), Sergey Zykov (3-6), Sergey Kuzmin (5-6), Mikhail Chertishchev (с 7)

Sound Engineer - Maria Barinova (4-7), Ekaterina Vinogradova (4-7), Sergey Tarasov (с 7), Maksim Romasevich (1-4), Yevgeny Zhebchuk (4-7), Kirill Glezin (4-7), Vladimir Golounin (4-7).

Compositor and visualization editor - Maya Smorodina (1), Valeria Tarasova (2), Maksim Strogalev (3), Julia Kayugina (5), Alexandra Agrinskaya (7). Previously: Fedor Dmitriev (1), Elena Galdobina (1), Stanislav Pashkov (1), Elena Gorbunova (2), Irina Bravaya (3-5), Mikhail Litvinov (7), Maria Volokushina (7)

Episodes

References

External links
Website of the animated series
YouTube video hosting channel
VKontakte Group

2000s animated television series
2010s animated television series
2000s Russian television series
2010s Russian television series
2006 Russian television series debuts
2016 Russian television series endings
Russian children's animated adventure television series
Russian children's animated comedy television series
Russia-1 original programming
Carousel (TV channel) original programming